Typhedanus is a genus of Neotropical butterflies in the family Hesperiidae (Eudaminae).

Species
The following species are recognosed in the genus Typhedanus:
 Typhedanus ampyx (Godman & Salvin, [1893]) - Venezuela to Mexico, Amazon
 Typhedanus aventinus (Godman & Salvin, 1894)
 Typhedanus buena (A. Warren, Dolibaina & Hernández-Mejía, 2015)
 Typhedanus cajeta (Herrich-Schäffer, 1869)
 Typhedanus mala (Evans, 1953)
 Typhedanus salas Freeman, 1977 - Mexico
 Typhedanus umber (Herrich-Schäffer, 1869) - Venezuela

References

Natural History Museum Lepidoptera genus database

External links
images representing Typhedanus at Consortium for the Barcode of Life

Hesperiidae
Butterflies of Central America
Hesperiidae of South America
Butterflies of North America
Lepidoptera of Brazil
Lepidoptera of Colombia
Lepidoptera of Ecuador
Lepidoptera of Venezuela
Fauna of the Amazon
Hesperiidae genera
Taxa named by Arthur Gardiner Butler